Kiljunen is a Finnish surname. Notable people with the surname include:

 Kimmo Kiljunen (born 1951), Finnish politician
 Anneli Kiljunen (born 1957), Finnish politician
 Marja-Liisa Kiljunen, Finnish diplomat

Finnish-language surnames